Main Guard may refer to:
Main Guard (Clonmel)
Main Guard (Gibraltar)
Main Guard (Valletta)